Jimerson is a surname and may refer to:

Annette P. Jimerson (born 1966), American Fine Artist who works on a wide variety of media
Arthur Jimerson (born 1968), former linebacker for the former Los Angeles Raiders of the National Football League
Charlton Jimerson (born 1979), Major League Baseball outfielder
Douglas Jimerson, American singer known for his interpretation of Civil War songs
Jeff Jimerson, Pittsburgh-based singer, best known as the national anthem singer for the Pittsburgh Penguins
Shane R. Jimerson, Ph.D., is a professor at the University of California, Santa Barbara

See also
Benjamin O. Jimerson-Phillips, African American movie producer, director, songwriter, and screenwriter